The 2014 UCI Track Cycling World Championships was the World Championships for track cycling in 2014. They took place in Cali, Colombia from 26 February to 2 March 2014 in the Velódromo Alcides Nieto Patiño.

Schedule
This was the schedule of events:

Medal summary

Shaded events are non-Olympic

Medal table

References

External links

Results book
 Pictures on Flickr

 
UCI Track Cycling World Championships
2014
2014 UCI Track Cycling World Championships
UCI Track Cycling World Championships
Sport in Cali
February 2014 sports events in South America
March 2014 sports events in South America